Xolane Howard Mnisi (born 13 July 1989) is a South African rugby union player for the  in the Pro14. His regular position is centre.

Career

Youth

He played for their Under-19 team in 2008 and their Under-21 team in 2010.

Sharks

NMMU Madibaz

However, Mnisi failed to break into the Currie Cup team and joined Varsity Cup side  instead. He was included in the South Africa Students team in 2012 and 2013 and he was also voted as the "Back That Rocks" for the 2013 Varsity Cup tournament.

Griquas

Golden Lions

Mnisi moved to Johannesburg to join the  prior to the 2014 Currie Cup Premier Division season.

South Africa 'A'

In 2016, Mnisi was included in a South Africa 'A' squad that played a two-match series against a touring England Saxons team. He was named in the starting line-up for their first match in Bloemfontein, but ended on the losing side as the visitors ran out 32–24 winners. He was named on the bench for the second match of the series, coming on as a second-half replacement in a 26–29 defeat to the Saxons in George.

References

1989 births
Living people
People from Albert Luthuli Local Municipality
Swazi
South African rugby union players
Rugby union centres
Griquas (rugby union) players
Cheetahs (rugby union) players
Sharks (Currie Cup) players
Nelson Mandela University alumni
Golden Lions players
Lions (United Rugby Championship) players
Southern Kings players
Free State Cheetahs players
Rugby union players from Mpumalanga